Steve Ray Poapst (born January 3, 1969) is a Canadian former professional ice hockey defenceman who played seven seasons in the National Hockey League (NHL) for the Washington Capitals, Chicago Blackhawks, Pittsburgh Penguins and St. Louis Blues. Advancing to management after his playing career was over, he was named head coach of the USHL Chicago Steel in December 2006. In August 2010, Poapst moved up the ranks, taking an assistant coaching job with the Rockford IceHogs of the AHL, bringing him back into the Chicago Blackhawks system.

Career statistics

Ice hockey

Roller hockey

Awards and honors

References

External links

1969 births
Living people
Baltimore Skipjacks players
Canadian ice hockey defencemen
Chicago Blackhawks players
Colgate Raiders men's ice hockey players
Hampton Roads Admirals players
Sportspeople from Cornwall, Ontario
New England Stingers players
Norfolk Admirals players
Pittsburgh Penguins players
Portland Pirates players
St. Louis Blues players
Undrafted National Hockey League players
Washington Capitals players
Ice hockey people from Ontario